The 2017 Chicago White Sox season was the franchise’s 118th season in Chicago and 117th in the American League. It was also the team’s first season under new manager Rick Renteria following Robin Ventura, who chose not to extend his contract with the team after five seasons. The White Sox missed the playoffs for the ninth consecutive season, and finished in 4th place in their division and second worst in the AL respectively.

Offseason
After another disappointing season in 2016, GM Rick Hahn and the White Sox decided to rebuild the franchise for future success. 

 November 3, 2016, Matt Albers, Alex Avila, Austin Jackson and Justin Morneau granted free agency. White Sox released pitcher Daniel Webb.
 November 7, 2016, Jason Bourgeois, Tony Campana, Brett Hayes, Slade Heathcott, John Holdzkom, Kameron Loe, Andy Parrino, J. B. Shuck, Jacob Turner and Chris Volstad granted free agency. Selected pitcher Giovanni Soto off waivers from the Oakland Athletics.
 November 22, 2016, White Sox released pitcher Anthony Ranaudo.
 December 2, 2016, White Sox signed pitcher Jorge Rondón as a free agent. Blake Smith granted free agency.
 December 6, 2016, White Sox ace Chris Sale was traded to the Boston Red Sox for prospects Luis Alexander Basabe, Víctor Díaz, Michael Kopech and Yoan Moncada. 
 December 7, 2016, Rick Hahn traded away their leadoff hitter, outfielder Adam Eaton to the Washington Nationals for pitching prospects Dane Dunning, Lucas Giolito and Reynaldo López. 
 December 8, 2016, the White Sox drafted pitcher Dylan Covey from the Oakland Athletics in the 2016 rule 5 draft.
 December 9, 2016, White Sox signed outfielder Caleb Gindl as a free agent.
 December 14, 2016, White Sox signed pitcher Derek Holland as a free agent.
 December 16, 2016, White Sox signed pitcher Chris Volstad as a free agent.
 December 22, 2016, White Sox signed Cody Asche as a free agent.
 December 28, 2016, White Sox released pitcher Jorge Rondón.
 January 6, 2017, White Sox selected outfielder Willy García off waivers from the Pittsburgh Pirates.
 January 7, 2017, White Sox signed outfielder Jason Bourgeois and shortstop Everth Cabrera as free agents.
 January 10, 2017, White Sox signed catcher Geovany Soto as a free agent.
 January 11, 2017, White Sox signed catcher Carson Blair as a free agent. Outfielder Jason Coats selected by the Tampa Bay Rays off waivers.
 January 12, 2017, White Sox signed pitcher Cory Luebke as a free agent.
 January 20, 2017, White Sox signed pitcher Gregory Infante as a free agent.
 January 23, 2017, White Sox signed pitchers Blake Smith and Anthony Swarzak as free agents.
 January 27, 2017, White Sox signed pitcher Mayckol Guaipe as a free agent.
 January 30, 2017, White Sox Signed outfielder Peter Bourjos as a free agent.
 February 13, 2017, White Sox signed pitcher Tyler Matzek as a free agent.
 February 18, 2017, White Sox signed pitcher Scott Snodgress as a free agent.
 February 27, 2017, White Sox signed Tyler Ladendorf as a free agent.
 March 2, 2017, White Sox signed pitcher Jake Dunning as a free agent.
 March 3, 2017, White Sox released infielder Brett Lawrie.
 March 20, 2017, White Sox released outfielder Caleb Gindl.
 March 25, 2017, White Sox released pitcher Mayckol Guaipe.
 March 28, 2017, White Sox sold outfielder Peter Bourjos to the Tampa Bay Rays.
 March 30, 2017, White Sox released pitchers Tyler Matzek and Blake Smith.

Regular season
During the season GM Rick Hahn continued his rebuild plan to trade away key players for top prospects. 

 April 8, 2017, White Sox signed pitcher Mike Pelfrey and Ryan Raburn as free agents.
 May 8, 2017, pitcher Cory Luebke voluntarily retired.
 May 26, 2017, White Sox traded Ryan Raburn to the Washington Nationals for a player to be named later or cash.
 June 6, 2017, White Sox signed pitcher Bobby Parnell as a free agent.
 June 9, 2017, White Sox released catcher Giovanni Soto. Selected Alen Hanson off waivers from the Pittsburgh Pirates.
 June 21, 2017, White Sox signed second baseman Grant Green as a free agent.
 June 28, 2017, White Sox released pitcher Jake Dunning.
 June 29, 2017, White Sox signed catcher Rob Brantly as a free agent.
 July 13, 2017, the White Sox traded away their ace José Quintana to their crosstown rival Chicago Cubs for Dylan Cease, Bryant Flete, Eloy Jiménez and Matt Rose. 
 July 14, 2017, White Sox released shortstop Everth Cabrera.
 July 19, 2017, the White Sox traded third baseman Todd Frazier, relief pitcher Tommy Kahnle and closer David Robertson to the New York Yankees for Ian Clarkin, Tito Polo, Blake Rutherford and Tyler Clippard.
 July 24, 2017, White Sox signed pitcher Danny Farquhar as a free agent. Purchased pitchers Mark Lowe and Jean Machi from the Seattle Mariners. Released catcher Carson Blair and pitcher Bobby Parnell.
 July 26, 2017, a trade with the Milwaukee Brewers sent relief pitcher Anthony Swarzak for outfielder Ryan Cordell. 
 July 27, 2017, the White Sox sent relief pitcher Dan Jennings to the Tampa Bay Rays for first baseman Casey Gillaspie. 
 July 30, 2017, Rick Hahn traded outfielder Melky Cabrera and cash to division rival Kansas City Royals for Andre Davis and pitcher A. J. Puckett. 
 August 4, 2017, White Sox signed pitcher Al Alburquerque as a free agent.
 August 7, 2017, White Sox released second baseman Grant Green.
 August 9, 2017, White Sox purchased pitcher Steve Johnson from the Baltimore Orioles.
 August 13, 2017, recently acquired pitcher Tyler Clippard was traded to the Houston Astros for a player to be named later or cash. 
 August 21, 2017, White Sox released pitcher Mark Lowe.
 August 31, 2017, pitcher Miguel González was traded to the Texas Rangers for third baseman Ti'Quan Forbes. 
 September 5, 2017, White Sox released pitcher Derek Holland.

Season standings

American League Central

American League Wild Card

Record against opponents

Game log

|-style="background:#bbb"
| — || April 3 || Tigers || 3:10 pm || colspan="7" | Postponed (rain) (Rescheduled for April 4)
|-style="background:#fbb"
| 1 || April 4 || Tigers || 1:10 pm || 3–6 || Verlander (1–0) || Quintana (0–1) || Rodríguez (1) || 0–1 || 36,534 || L1
|-style="background:#bbb"
| — || April 5 || Tigers || 1:10 pm || colspan="7" | Postponed (rain) (Rescheduled for May 26) 
|-style="background:#cfc"
| 2 || April 6 || Tigers || 1:10 pm || 11–2 || Shields (1–0) || Boyd (0–1) || — || 1–1 || 10,842 || W1
|-style="background:#fbb"
| 3 || April 7 || Twins || 7:10 pm || 1–3 || Hughes (1–0) || Holland (0–1) || Kintzler (2) || 1–2 || 14,004 || L1
|-style="background:#cfc"
| 4 || April 8 || Twins || 1:10 pm || 6–2 || González (1–0) || Mejía (0–1) || — || 2–2 || 23,024 || W1
|-style="background:#fbb"
| 5 || April 9 || Twins || 1:10 pm || 1–4 || Santana (2–0) || Quintana (0–2) || Kintzler (3) || 2–3 || 24,074 || L1
|-style="background:#fbb"
| 6 || April 11 || @ Indians || 3:10 pm || 1–2 (10) || Shaw (1–0) || Kahnle (0–1) || — || 2–4 || 35,002 || L2
|-style="background:#cfc"
| 7 || April 12 || @ Indians || 5:10 pm || 2–1 || Holland (1–1) || Salazar (0–1) || Robertson (1) || 3–4 || 15,628 || W1
|-style="background:#cfc"
| 8 || April 13 || @ Indians || 5:10 pm || 10–4 || Swarzak (1–0) || Tomlin (0–2) || — || 4–4 || 15,060 || W2
|-style="background:#cfc"
| 9 || April 14 || @ Twins || 7:10 pm || 2–1 || Jennings (1–0) || Pressly (0–1) || Robertson (2) || 5–4 || 18,466 || W3
|-style="background:#fbb"
| 10 || April 15 || @ Twins || 1:10 pm || 0–6 || Santana (3–0) || Quintana (0–3) || — || 5–5 || 25,938 || L1
|-style="background:#cfc"
| 11 || April 16 || @ Twins || 3:10 pm || 3–1 (10) || Jones (1–0) || Pressly (0–2) || Robertson (3) || 6–5 || 19,511 || W1
|-style="background:#fbb"
| 12 || April 17 || @ Yankees || 6:05 pm || 4–7 || Montgomery (1–0) || Holland (1–2) || Chapman (4) || 6–6 || 28,181 || L1
|-style="background:#cfc"
| 13 || April 18 || @ Yankees || 6:05 pm || 4–1 || González (2–0) || Severino (1–1) || Robertson (4) || 7–6 || 30,075 || W1
|-style="background:#fbb"
| 14 || April 19 || @ Yankees || 6:05 pm || 1–9 || Tanaka (2–1) || Covey (0–1) || — || 7–7 || 30,014 || L1
|-style="background:#fbb"
| 15 || April 21 || Indians || 7:10 pm || 0–3 || Kluber (2–1) || Quintana (0–4) || — || 7–8 || 18,159 || L2
|-style="background:#fbb"
| 16 || April 22 || Indians || 6:10 pm || 0–7 || Carrasco (2–1) || Pelfrey (0–1) || — || 7–9 || 32,044 || L3
|-style="background:#cfc"
| 17 || April 23 || Indians || 1:10 pm || 6–2 || Holland (2–2) || Salazar (1–2) || — || 8–9 || 24,444 || W1
|-style="background:#cfc"
| 18 || April 24 || Royals || 7:10 pm || 12–1 || González (3–0) || Vargas (3–1) || — || 9–9 || 11,484 || W2
|-style="background:#cfc"
| 19 || April 25 || Royals || 7:10 pm || 10–5 || Jennings (2–0) || Duffy (2–1) || — || 10–9 || 14,591 || W3
|-style="background:#cfc"
| 20 || April 26 || Royals || 1:10 pm || 5–2 || Quintana (1–4) || Karns (0–2) || Robertson (5) || 11–9 || 18,218 || W4
|-style="background:#cfc"
| 21 || April 28 || @ Tigers || 6:10 pm || 7–3 || Swarzak (2–0) || Wilson (0–1) || — || 12–9 || 26,049 || W5
|-style="background:#cfc"
| 22 || April 29 || @ Tigers || 12:10pm || 6–4 (10) || Robertson (1–0) || Wilson (1–1) || — || 13–9 || 36,217 || W6
|-style="background:#fbb
| 23 || April 30 || @ Tigers || 12:10pm || 3–7 || Zimmermann (3–1) || González (3–1) || — || 13–10 || 26,045 || L1
|-

|-style="background:#fbb
| 24 || May 1 || @ Royals || 7:15 pm || 1–6 || Vargas (4–1) || Covey (0–2) || — || 13–11 || 20,148 || L2
|-style="background:#cfc"
| 25 || May 2 || @ Royals || 7:15 pm || 6–0 || Quintana (2–4) || Duffy (2–2) || — || 14–11 || 18,604 || W1
|-style="background:#fbb
| 26 || May 3 || @ Royals || 7:15 pm || 1–6 || Karns (1–2) || Pelfrey (0–2) || — || 14–12 || 22,298 || L1
|-style="background:#cfc"
| 27 || May 4 || @ Royals || 1:15 pm || 8–3 || Holland (3–2) || Kennedy (0–3) || — || 15–12 || 36,525 || W1
|-style="background:#fbb
| 28 || May 5 || @ Orioles || 6:05 pm || 2–4 || Ynoa (1–0) || González (3–2) || Brach (6) || 15–13 || 20,302 || L1
|-style="background:#fbb
| 29 || May 6 || @ Orioles || 6:05 pm || 5–6 || Bundy (5–1) || Covey (0–3) || O'Day (2) || 15–14 || 28,718 || L2
|-style="background:#fbb
| 30 || May 7 || @ Orioles || 12:35pm || 0–4 || Tillman (1–0) || Quintana (2–5) || Brach (7) || 15–15 || 31,806 || L3
|-style="background:#fbb
| 31 || May 9 || Twins || 7:10 pm || 2–7 || Santiago (4–1) || Pelfrey (0–3) || — || 15–16 || 14,498 || L4
|-style="background:#bbb"
| — || May 10 || Twins || 7:10 pm || colspan="7" | Postponed (rain) (Rescheduled for August 21) 
|-style="background:#fbb
| 32 || May 11 || Twins || 7:10 pm || 6–7 || Pressly (1–2) || Holland (3–3) || Kintzler (8) || 15–17 || 16,084 || L5
|-style="background:#fbb
| 33 || May 12 || Padres || 7:10 pm || 3–6 || Chacín (4–3) || González (3–3) || Maurer (5) || 15–18 || 24,194 || L6
|-style="background:#cfc"
| 34 || May 13 || Padres || 6:10 pm || 5–4 || Robertson (2–0) || Hand (0–3) || — || 16–18 || 29,111 || W1
|-style="background:#cfc"
| 35 || May 14 || Padres || 1:10 pm || 9–3 || Ynoa (1–0) || Buchter (2–2) || — || 17–18 || 22,518 || W2
|-style="background:#fbb
| 36 || May 15 || @ Angels || 9:07 pm || 3–5 || Chavez (3–5) || Pelfrey (0–4) || Norris (8) || 17–19 || 29,445 || L1
|-style="background:#fbb
| 37 || May 16 || @ Angels || 9:07 pm || 6–7 (11) || Petit (1–0) || Robertson (2–1) || — || 17–20 || 36,089 || L2
|-style="background:#fbb
| 38 || May 17 || @ Angels || 9:07 pm || 8–12 || Shoemaker (3–2) || González (3–4) || — || 17–21 || 33,234 || L3
|-style="background:#fbb
| 39 || May 18 || @ Mariners || 9:10 pm || 4–5 || Vincent (2–1) || Jennings (2–1) || — || 17–22 || 17,757 || L4
|-style="background:#cfc"
| 40 || May 19 || @ Mariners || 9:10 pm || 2–1 (10) || Robertson (3–1) || Zych (2–1) || — || 18–22 || 32,371 || W1
|-style="background:#cfc"
| 41 || May 20 || @ Mariners || 9:10 pm || 16–1 || Pelfrey (1–4) || Gallardo (2–4) || — || 19–22 || 33,801 || W2
|-style="background:#cfc"
| 42 || May 21 || @ Mariners || 3:10 pm || 8–1 || Holland (4–3) || Heston (0–1) || — || 20–22 || 36,782 || W3
|-style="background:#fbb
| 43 || May 22 || @ Diamondbacks || 8:40 pm || 1–5 || Greinke (6–2) || González (3–5) || — || 20–23 || 18,333 || L1
|-style="background:#fbb
| 44 || May 23 || @ Diamondbacks || 8:40 pm || 4–5 || Corbin (4–4) || Covey (0–4) || Rodney (11) || 20–24 || 17,865 || L2
|-style="background:#fbb
| 45 || May 24 || @ Diamondbacks || 2:40 pm || 6–8 || Chafin (1–0) || Quintana (2–6) || Rodney (12) || 20–25 || 18,002 || L3
|-style="background:#bbb"
| – || May 26 || Tigers || 4:10 pm || colspan="7" | Postponed (rain) (Rescheduled for May 27)
|-style="background:#cfc"
| 46 || May 26 || Tigers || 7:45 pm || 8–2 || Pelfrey (2–4) || Boyd (2–5)
|| — || 21–25 || 17,842 || W1
|-style="background:#cfc"
| 47 || May 27 || Tigers || 1:10 pm || 3–0 || Danish (1–0) || Fulmer (5–3) || Robertson (6) || 22–25 || 26,327 || W2
|-style="background:#fbb
| 48 || May 27 || Tigers || 4:30 pm || 3–4 || Farmer (1–0) || Holland (4–4) || — || 22–26 || 26,327 || L1
|-style="background:#cfc"
| 49 || May 28 || Tigers || 1:10 pm || 7–3 || González (4–5) || Zimmermann (4–4) || Robertson (7) || 23–26 || 27,578 || W1
|-style="background:#cfc"
| 50 || May 29 || Red Sox || 1:10 pm || 5–4 || Minaya (1–0) || Barnes (3–2) || Robertson (8) || 24–26 || 27,148 || W2
|-style="background:#fbb
| 51 || May 30 || Red Sox || 7:10 pm || 7–13 || Sale (6–2) || Quintana (2–7) || Kimbrel (14) || 24–27 || 21,852 || L1
|-style="background:#fbb
| 52 || May 31 || Red Sox || 7:10 pm || 1–4 || Pomeranz (5–3) || Swarzak (2–1) || Kimbrel (15) || 24–28 || 19,075 || L2
|-

|-style="background:#fbb
| 53 || June 2 || @ Tigers || 6:10 pm || 5–15 || Fulmer (6–3) || Holland (4–5) || — || 24–29 || 28,619 || L3
|-style="background:#fbb
| 54 || June 3 || @ Tigers || 3:10 pm || 1–10 || Zimmermann (5–4) || González (4–6) || — || 24–30 || 33,188 || L4
|-style="background:#fbb
| 55 || June 4 || @ Tigers || 12:10pm || 4–7 || Wilson (2–1) || Robertson (3–2) || — || 24–31 || 30,208 || L5
|-style="background:#cfc"
| 56 || June 6 || @ Rays || 6:10 pm || 4–2 || Beck (1–0) || Archer (4–4) || Robertson (9) || 25–31 || 14,590 || W1
|-style="background:#fbb
| 57 || June 7 || @ Rays || 6:10 pm || 1–3 || Faria (1–0) || Pelfrey (2–5) || Colomé (16) || 25–32 || 9,313 || L1
|-style="background:#fbb
| 58 || June 8 || @ Rays || 6:10 pm || 5–7 || Odorizzi (4–3) || Holland (4–6) || Colomé (17) || 25–33 || 8,971 || L2
|-style="background:#fbb
| 59 || June 9 || @ Indians || 6:10 pm || 3–7 || Kluber (5–2) || González (4–7) || — || 25–34 || 30,043 || L3
|-style="background:#cfc"
| 60 || June 10 || @ Indians || 6:15 pm || 5–3 || Holmberg (1–0) || Tomlin (3–8) || Robertson (10) || 26–34 || 31,753 || W1
|-style="background:#fbb
| 61 || June 11 || @ Indians || 12:10pm || 2–4 || Carrasco (6–3) || Quintana (2–8) || Allen (15) || 26–35 || 26,611 || L1
|-style="background:#cfc"
| 62 || June 12 || Orioles || 7:10 pm || 10–7 || Petricka (1–0) || Miley (2–4) || — || 27–35 || 17,665 || W1
|-style="background:#cfc"
| 63 || June 13 || Orioles || 7:10 pm || 6–1 || Holland (5–6) || Asher (2–5) || — || 28–35 || 15,038 || W2
|-style="background:#fbb
| 64 || June 14 || Orioles || 7:10 pm || 6–10 || Bundy (7–5) || González (4–8) || — || 28–36 || 20,008 || L1
|-style="background:#cfc"
| 65 || June 15 || Orioles || 1:10 pm || 5–2 || Swarzak (3–1) || Tillman (1–5) || — || 29–36 || 20,139 || W1
|-style="background:#cfc"
| 66 || June 16 || @ Blue Jays || 6:07 pm || 11–4 || Quintana (3–8) || Biagini (1–6) || — || 30–36 || 39,071 || W2
|-style="background:#cfc"
| 67 || June 17 || @ Blue Jays || 12:07pm || 5–2 || Pelfrey (3–5) || Stroman (7–3) || Robertson (11) || 31–36 || 47,171 || W3
|-style="background:#fbb
| 68 || June 18 || @ Blue Jays || 12:07pm || 3–7 || Happ (2–4) || Swarzak (3–2) || — || 31–37 || 46,599 || L1
|-style="background:#fbb
| 69 || June 20 || @ Twins || 7:10 pm || 7–9 || Santana (9–4) || Holland (5–7) ||Kintzler (18) || 31–38 || 26,095 || L2
|-style="background:#fbb
| 70 || June 21 || @ Twins || 7:10 pm || 2–4 || Berríos (7–1) || Holmberg (1–1) || Kintzler (19) || 31–39 || 33,316 || L3
|-style="background:#cfc"
| 71 || June 22 || @ Twins || 12:10pm || 9–0 || Quintana (4–8) || Turley (0–2) || — || 32–39 || 27,684 || W1
|-style="background:#fbb
| 72 || June 23 || Athletics || 7:10 pm || 0–3 || Cotton (5–7) || Pelfrey (3–6) || Casilla (12) || 32–40 || 25,370 || L1
|-style="background:#fbb
| 73 || June 24 || Athletics || 1:10 pm || 2–10 || Gossett (1–2) || Shields (1–1) || — || 32–41 || 38,618 || L2
|-style="background:#fbb
| 74 || June 25 || Athletics || 1:10 pm || 3–5 || Gray (3–3) || Kahnle (0–2) || Casilla (13) || 32–42 || 28,089 || L3
|-style="background:#fbb
| 75 || June 26 || Yankees || 7:10 pm || 5–6 || Montgomery (6–4) || Holmberg (1–2) || Chapman (8) || 32–43 || 20,339 || L4
|-style="background:#cfc"
| 76 || June 27 || Yankees || 7:10 pm || 4–3 || Jennings (3–1) || Betances (3–2) || — || 33–43 || 18,023 || W1
|-style="background:#fbb
| 77 || June 28 || Yankees || 7:10 pm || 3–12 || Tanaka (6–7) || Rodon (0–1) ||— || 33–44 || 15,259 || L1
|-style="background:#cfc"
| 78 || June 29 || Yankees || 7:10 pm || 4–3 || Shields (2–1) || Cessa (0–3) || Robertson (12) || 34–44 || 21,032 || W1
|-style="background:#cfc"
| 79 || June 30 || Rangers || 7:10 pm || 8–7 || Swarzak (4–2) || Bush (2–4) || — || 35–44 || 18,838 || W2
|-

|-style="background:#fbb
| 80 || July 1 || Rangers || 1:10 pm || 4–10 || Hamels (3–0) || Holland (5–8) || — || 35–45 || 22,915 || L1
|-style="background:#cfc"
| 81 || July 2 || Rangers || 1:10 pm || 6–5 || Robertson (4–2) || Leclerc (1–2) || — || 36–45 || 26,206 || W1
|-style="background:#cfc"
| 82 || July 3 || @ Athletics || 8:05 pm || 7–2 || Rodon (1–1) || Cotton (5–8) || — || 37–45 || 40,019 || W2
|-style="background:#fbb
| 83 || July 4 || @ Athletics || 3:05 pm || 6–7 || Casilla (2–3) || Kahnle (0–3) || — || 37–46 || 16,314 || L1
|-style="background:#fbb
| 84 || July 5 || @ Athletics || 2:35 pm || 4–7 || Gray (4–4) || Pelfrey (3–7) || — || 37–47 || 13,813 || L2 
|-style="background:#fbb
| 85 || July 7 || @ Rockies || 7:40 pm || 4–12 || Márquez (6–4) || Holland (5–9) || — || 37–48 || 38,386 || L3
|-style="background:#cfc"
| 86 || July 8 || @ Rockies || 8:10 pm || 5–4 || Kahnle (1–3) || Holland (1–1) || Robertson (13) || 38–48 || 48,118 || W1
|-style="background:#fbb
| 87 || July 9 || @ Rockies || 2:10 pm || 0–10 || Freeland (9–7) || Rodon (1–2) || — || 38–49 || 36,541 || L1
|-style="background:
|- style="text-align:center; background:#bbcaff;"
| colspan="11" | 88th All-Star Game in Miami, Florida
|-style="background:#fbb
| 88 || July 14 || Mariners || 7:10 pm || 2–4 || Paxton (8–3) || Shields (2–2) || Díaz (14) || 38–50 || 20,311 || L2
|-style="background:#fbb
| 89 || July 15 || Mariners || 6:10 pm || 3–4 || Hernández (5–3) || Swarzak (4–3) || Díaz (15) || 38–51 || 21,743 || L3
|-style="background:#fbb
| 90 || July 16 || Mariners || 1:10 pm || 6–7 (10) || Vincent (3–1) || Beck (1–1) || Díaz (16) || 38–52 || 24,502 || L4
|-style="background:#fbb
| 91 || July 18 || Dodgers || 7:10 pm || 0–1 || Kershaw (15–2) || González (4–9) || Jansen (24) || 38–53 || 23,088 || L5
|-style="background:#fbb
| 92 || July 19 || Dodgers || 7:10 pm || 1–9 (8) || Maeda (8–4) || Rodon (1–3) || — || 38–54 || 24,907 || L6
|-style="background:#fbb
| 93 || July 21 || @ Royals || 7:15 pm || 6–7 (10) || Feliz (2–5) || Clippard (1–6) || — || 38–55 || 29,647 || L7
|-style="background:#fbb
| 94 || July 22 || @ Royals || 6:15 pm || 2–7 || Alexander (2–3) || Holmberg (1–3) || — || 38–56 || 34,088 || L8
|-style="background:#fbb
| 95 || July 23 || @ Royals || 1:15 pm || 4–5 || Herrera (3–2) || Infante (0–1) || — || 38–57 || 23,184 || L9
|-style="background:#cfc"
| 96 || July 24 || @ Cubs || 1:20 pm || 3–1 || González (5–9) || Grimm (1–1) || Swarzak (1) || 39–57 || 40,849 || W1
|-style="background:#fbb
| 97 || July 25 || @ Cubs || 1:20 pm || 2–7 || Lackey (7–9) || Rodon (1–4) || — || 39–58 || 40,717 || L1 
|-style="background:#fbb
| 98 || July 26 || Cubs || 7:10 pm || 3–8 || Arrieta (10–7) || Shields (2–3) || — || 39–59 || 38,517 || L2
|-style="background:#fbb
| 99 || July 27 || Cubs || 7:10 pm || 3–6 || Lester (8–6) || Pelfrey (3–8) || — || 39–60 || 39,422 || L3
|-style="background:#fbb
| 100 || July 28 || Indians || 7:10 pm || 3–9 || Salazar (4–5) || Holland (5–10) || — || 39–61 || 20,387 || L4
|-style="background:#fbb
| 101 || July 29 || Indians || 6:10 pm || 4–5 || Miller (4–3) || Bummer (0–1) || Allen (19) || 39–62 || 30,115 || L5
|-style="background:#cfc"
| 102 || July 30 || Indians || 1:10 pm || 3–1 || Clippard (2–6) || Shaw (4–5) || — || 40–62 || 28,152 || W1
|-style="background:#cfc"
| 103 || July 31 || Blue Jays || 7:10 pm || 7–6 || Beck (2–1) || Osuna (3–2) || — || 41–62 || 13,023 || W2
|-

|-style="background:#fbb
| 104 || August 1 || Blue Jays || 7:10 pm || 4–8 || Stroman (10–5) || Pelfrey (3–9) || — || 41–63 || 14,622 || L1
|-style="background:#fbb
| 105 || August 2 || Blue Jays || 1:10 pm || 1–5 || Happ (4–8) || Holland (5–11) || Osuna (27) || 41–64 || 20,878 || L2
|-style="background:#fbb
| 106 || August 3 || @ Red Sox || 6:10 pm || 5–9 || Porcello (5–14) || González (5–10) || — || 41–65 || 37,442 || L3
|-style="background:#fbb
| 107 || August 4 || @ Red Sox || 6:10 pm || 2–3 (11) || Hembree (2–3) || Bummer (0–2) || — || 41–66 || 36,612 || L4
|-style="background:#fbb
| 108 || August 5 || @ Red Sox || 6:10 pm || 1–4 || Pomeranz (11–4) || Shields (2–4) || Kimbrel (26) || 41–67 || 36,599 || L5
|-style="background:#fbb
| 109 || August 6 || @ Red Sox || 12:35pm || 3–6 || Fister (2–5) || Pelfrey (3–10) || Kimbrel (27) || 41–68 || 37,283 || L6
|-style="background:#cfc"
| 110 || August 8 || Astros || 7:10 pm || 8–5 || Holland (6–11) || Keuchel (9–2) || Clippard (2) || 42–68 || 13,974 || W1
|-style="background:#cfc"
| 111 || August 9 || Astros || 7:10 pm || 7–1 || González (6–10) || McHugh (0–1) || — || 43–68 || 14,824 || W2
|-style="background:#cfc"
| 112 || August 10 || Astros || 7:10 pm || 3–2 (11) || Holmberg (2–3) || Martes (4–2) || — || 44–68 || 18,034 || W3
|-style="background:#cfc"
| 113 || August 11 || Royals || 7:10 pm || 6–3 || Bummer (1–2) || Duffy (7–8) || Clippard (3) || 45–68 || 18,173 || W4
|-style="background:#fbb
| 114 || August 12 || Royals || 6:10 pm || 4–5 || Alexander (3–3) || Bummer (1–3) || Herrera (25) || 45–69 || 20,413 || L1
|-style="background:#fbb
| 115 || August 13 || Royals || 1:10 pm || 6–14 || Vargas (14–6) || Holland (6–12) || — || 45–70 || 27,351 || L2
|-style="background:#fbb
| 116 || August 15 || @ Dodgers || 9:10 pm || 1–6 || Morrow (5–0) || Minaya (1–1) || — || 45–71 || 46,385 || L3
|-style="background:#fbb
| 117 || August 16 || @ Dodgers || 9:10 pm || 4–5 || Stripling (2–4) || Petricka (1–1) || — || 45–72 || 52,413 || L4
|-style="background:#fbb
| 118 || August 17 || @ Rangers || 7:05 pm || 8–9 || Bibens-Dirkx (4–2) || López (0–1) || Claudio (6) || 45–73 || 23,459 || L5
|-style="background:#cfc"
| 119 || August 18 || @ Rangers || 7:05 pm || 4–3 || Infante (1–1) || Rodríguez (0–1) || Minaya (1) || 46–73 || 23,402 || W1
|-style="background:#fbb
| 120 || August 19 || @ Rangers || 7:05 pm || 7–17 || Pérez (8–10) || Holland (6–13) || — || 46–74 || 33,441 || L1
|-style="background:#cfc"
| 121 || August 20 || @ Rangers || 2:05 pm || 3–2 || González (7–10) || Griffin (6–4) || Minaya (2) || 47–74 || 23,861 || W1
|-style="background:#cfc"
| 122 || August 21 || Twins || 4:10 pm || 7–6 || Rodon (2–4) || Melville (0–1) || Minaya (3) || 48–74 || 14,493 || W2
|-style="background:#fbb
| 123 || August 21 || Twins || 7:10 pm || 2–10 || Gee (1–0) || Fulmer (0–1) || Duffey (1) || 48–75 || 14,493 || L1
|-style="background:#fbb
| 124 || August 22 || Twins || 7:10 pm || 1–4 || Gibson (7–10) || Giolito (0–1) || Belisle (4) || 48–76 || 14,053 || L2
|-style="background:#cfc"
| 125 || August 23 || Twins || 7:10 pm || 4–3 || Farquhar (3–2) || Hildenberger (2–2) || — || 49–76 || 15,605 || W1
|-style="background:#cfc"
| 126 || August 24 || Twins || 7:10 pm || 5–1 || Holland (7–13) || Berríos (11–6) || — || 50–76 || 16,013 || W2
|-style="background:#cfc"
| 127 || August 25 || Tigers || 7:10 pm || 3–2 || Minaya (2–1) || Jiménez (0–2) || — || 51–76 || 23,171 || W3
|-style="background:#fbb
| 128 || August 26 || Tigers || 6:10 pm || 3–6 || Farmer (3–1) || Rodon (2–5) || Greene (5) || 51–77 || 29,489 || L1
|-style="background:#cfc"
| 129 || August 27 || Tigers || 1:10 pm || 7–1 || Giolito (1–1) || Boyd (5–8) || — || 52–77 || 22,532 || W1
|-style="background:#fbb
| 130 || August 29 || @ Twins || 7:10 pm || 4–6 || Santana (14–7) || Shields (2–5) || Belisle (5) || 52–78 || 20,530 || L1
|-style="background:#fbb
| 131 || August 30 || @ Twins || 7:10 pm || 1–11 || Berríos (12–6) || Holland (7–14) || — || 52–79 || 21,172 || L2
|-style="background:#fbb
| 132 || August 31 || @ Twins || 12:10pm || 4–5 || Belisle (1–2) || Minaya (2–2) || — || 52–80 || 21,288 || L3
|-

|-style="background:#fbb
| 133 || September 1 || Rays || 7:10 pm || 1–3 || Snell (3–6) || López (0–2) || Colomé (41) || 52–81 || 13,585 || L4
|-style="background:#cfc"
| 134 || September 2 || Rays || 6:10 pm || 5–4 || Fulmer (1–1) || Archer (9–8) || Minaya (4) || 53–81 || 17,700 || W1
|-style="background:#cfc"
| 135 || September 3 || Rays || 1:10 pm || 6–2 || Giolito (2–1) || Andriese (5–2) || — || 54–81 || 17,633 || W2
|-style="background:#fbb
| 136 || September 4 || Indians || 1:10 pm || 3–5 || Bauer (15–8) || Shields (2–6) || Allen (24) || 54–82 || 16,848 || L1
|-style="background:#fbb
| 137 || September 5 || Indians || 7:10 pm || 4–9 || Otero (3–0) || Holmberg (2–4) || — || 54–83 || 12,369 || L2
|-style="background:#fbb
| 138 || September 6 || Indians || 7:10 pm || 1–5 || Carrasco (14–6) || López (0–3) || — || 54–84 || 13,403 || L3
|-style="background:#fbb
| 139 || September 7 || Indians || 7:10 pm || 2–11 || Kluber (15–4) || Pelfrey (3–11) || — || 54–85 || 17,019 || L4
|-style="background:#fbb
| 140 || September 8 || Giants || 7:10 pm || 2–9 || Moore (5–13) || Giolito (2–2) || — || 54–86 || 16,852 || L5
|-style="background:#cfc"
| 141 || September 9 || Giants || 6:10 pm || 13–1 || Shields (3–6) || Samardzija (9–13) || — || 55–86 || 17,688 || W1
|-style="background:#cfc"
| 142 || September 10 || Giants || 1:10 pm || 8–1 || Fulmer (2–1) || Bumgarner (3–8) || — || 56–86 || 16,458 || W2
|-style="background:#cfc"
| 143 || September 11 || @ Royals || 7:15 pm || 11–3 || López (1–3) || Hammel (8–11) || — || 57–86 || 23,135 || W3
|-style="background:#fbb
| 144 || September 12 || @ Royals || 12:15 pm || 3–4 || Gaviglio (4–5) || Covey (0–5) || Alexander (4) || 57–87 || 17,727 || L1
|-style="background:#cfc"
| 145 || September 13 || @ Royals || 1:15 pm || 5–3 || Minaya (3–2) || Alexander (4–4) || — || 58–87 || 25,665 || W1
|-style="background:#cfc"
| 146 || September 14 || @ Tigers || 12:10pm || 17–7 || Shields (4–6) || Bell (0–3) || — || 59–87 || 26,743 || W2
|-style="background:#fbb
| 147 || September 15 || @ Tigers || 6:10 pm || 2–3 || Greene (4–3) || Alburquerque (0–2) || — || 59–88 || 25,298 || L1
|-style="background:#cfc"
| 148 || September 16 || @ Tigers || 5:10 pm || 10–4 || López (2–3) || Jaye (1–2) || — || 60–88 || 29,846 || W1
|-style="background:#fbb
| 149 || September 17 || @ Tigers || 12:10pm || 0–12 || Boyd (6–10) || Covey (0–6) || — || 60–89 || 25,663 || L1
|-style="background:#fbb
| 150 || September 19 || @ Astros || 7:10 pm || 1–3 || McHugh (3–2) || Giolito (2–3) || Giles (32) || 60–90 || 23,293 || L2
|-style="background:#fbb
| 151 || September 20 || @ Astros || 7:10 pm || 3–4 || Peacock (12–2) || Shields (4–7) || Musgrove (2) || 60–91 || 24,995 || L3
|-style="background:#cfc"
| 152 || September 21 || @ Astros || 7:10 pm || 3–1 || Volstad (1–0) || Keuchel (13–5) || Minaya (5) || 61–91 || 24,283 || W1
|-style="background:#cfc"
| 153 || September 22 || Royals || 7:10 pm || 7–6 || López (3–3) || Hammel (8–13) || Minaya (6) || 62–91 || 18,041 || W2
|-style="background:#fbb
| 154 || September 23 || Royals || 6:10 pm || 2–8 || Duffy (9–9) || Covey (0–7) ||  — || 62–92 || 20,306 || L1 
|-style="background:#cfc"
| 155 || September 24 || Royals || 1:10 pm || 8–1 || Giolito (3–3) || Kennedy (4–13) || — || 63–92 || 18,791 || W1
|-style="background:#cfc"
| 156 || September 25 || Angels || 7:10 pm || 4–2 || Shields (5–7) || Nolasco (6–15) || Minaya (7) || 64–92 || 13,443 || W2
|-style="background:#fbb
| 157 || September 26 || Angels || 7:10 pm || 3–9 || Bridwell (9–3) || Volstad (1–1) || — || 64–93 || 13,786 || L1
|-style="background:#cfc"
| 158 || September 27 || Angels || 7:10 pm || 6–4 (10) || Farquhar (4–2) || Parker (3–3) || — || 65–93 || 17,012 || W1
|-style="background:#cfc"
| 159 || September 28 || Angels || 7:10 pm || 5–4 || Infante (2–1) || Chavez (7–11) || Minaya (8) || 66–93 || 19,596 || W2
|-style="background:#fbb
| 160 || September 29 || @ Indians || 6:10 pm || 1–10 || Bauer (17–9) || Pelfrey (3–12) || — || 66–94 || 26,983 || L1
|-style="background:#cfc"
| 161 || September 30 || @ Indians || 6:10 pm || 2–1 || Fulmer (3–1) || Clevinger (12–6) || Minaya (9) || 67–94 || 33,173 || W1
|-style="background:#fbb
| 162 || October 1 || @ Indians || 2:10 pm || 1–3 || Tomlin (10–9) || Volstad (1–2) || Allen (30) || 67–95 || 30,036 || L1
|-

|- style="text-align:center;"
| Legend:       = Win       = Loss       = PostponementBold = White Sox team member

Personnel

Opening Day lineup

Roster

Statistics

Batting
BOLD denotes team leader

Note: G = Games played; AB = At bats; R = Runs; H = Hits; 2B = Doubles; 3B = Triples; HR = Home runs; RBI = Runs batted in; SB = Stolen bases; BB = Walks; K = Strikeouts; AVG = Batting average; OBP = On base percentage; SLG = Slugging percentage;

Pitching
BOLD denotes team leader

Note: W = Wins; L = Losses; ERA = Earned run average; G = Games pitched; GS = Games started; SV = Saves; IP = Innings pitched; R = Runs allowed; ER = Earned runs allowed; BB = Walks allowed; K = Strikeouts

Farm system

References

External links
2017 Chicago White Sox at Baseball Reference
2017 Chicago White Sox season Official Site
2017 Chicago White Sox season at ESPN

Chicago White Sox seasons
Chicago White Sox
White Sox